Laird & Company is a distillery located in the Scobeyville section of Colts Neck Township, New Jersey.  Founded by Robert Laird, it is the oldest licensed distillery in the United States and received License No. 1 from the U.S. Department of the Treasury in 1780. Laird has a rectifier and blender license from the New Jersey Division of Alcoholic Beverage Control.

Robert Laird, descended from one of Monmouth County's oldest families, served in the Continental Army under George Washington.   Washington asked Laird for his recipe for "cyder spirits" before the Revolution.  Today, none of the company's production is located in New Jersey.  It obtains all its apples from central Virginia and distills its products in North Garden, Virginia.  Distilling at its New Jersey facilities ceased in 1972 and Laird's only blends, ages and bottles its products in Scobeyville.

See also
 Alcohol laws of New Jersey
 List of wineries, breweries, and distilleries in New Jersey
 New Jersey wine
 New Jersey distilled spirits
 New Jersey Division of Alcoholic Beverage Control
 Bureau of Alcohol, Tobacco and Firearms

References

External links
 Laird & Company (business website)

Distilleries in New Jersey
American distilled drinks
Colts Neck Township, New Jersey